Pumpkin patch or Pumpkin Patch may refer to:

 A garden where pumpkins are planted, commonly available for sale
 Pumpkin Patch (retailer), a store in New Zealand selling children's clothes
 "Pumpkin Patch" (Scream Queens), the fifth episode of the American television series Scream Queens